Ahilya is a genus of Ichneumon wasps in the subfamily Cryptinae, tribe Cryptini and subtribe Gabuniina. Species have an Oriental distribution.

References

External links
 

 
 Ahilya at insectoid.info

Cryptinae
Ichneumonidae genera